Mara Darmousli, in Greek: Μάρα Δαρμουσλή, (born 15 August, in Ptolemaida, Greece) is a Greek former fashion model and current actress.

She has appeared in many international fashion events and magazines, her face appearing on the covers of such magazines as Vogue, Marie Claire and Bazaar. Her international advertisements include Pantene, Parah, Nivea, Simone Perele, Triumph, Clairol, Garnier and Carita.

In 1998 she was discovered by model agent and producer of the Greek Elite Model Look contest Nikos Voglis. She entered the contest and won first place in the Greek Elite Model Look final. She then advanced to the Nice International final, held in September in the French Riviera, where she came in third overall in the Pantene contest. Voglis as the owner of Prestige agency in Athens, managed the first years of her career.

She was a musician/performer with the percussion group "Ichodrasi". While still modeling She studied acting at Theatre Embros, physical and devised theatre at So7 and political sciences and history at Panteion University.

Mara was member of "ANASA" the first non-profit organisation for nutritional disorders in Greece.

In March 2007, she was awarded "Model of the Year" in Greece.

She has a son born 31 of march 2006 named Angel.

Filmography, television roles, and appearances
In 2005, Darmousli started acting appearing in the Greek film I Kardia Tou Ktinous (The Heart of the Beast) based on the novel by Petros Tatsopoulos, "Luton" and "Love, Love, Love".

Her TV experience includes appearances   on the series "Mehri tris einai Desmos" (ALTER), "To Kokkino Domatio" (MEGA) and most recently three episodes "Agria Paidia" (MEGA), "3os Nomos" (MEGA), "Heroides" (MEGA), "To soi sou" (ALPHA) and currently "Gynaika Xwris Onoma" (ANT1).

In theater,"Life after Low Flights" directed by D.Agoras(2019-20),"Astra Na Pane" directed by N.Magdalinos (2018–19), "The Game of Love and Chance" directed by E.Manios (2018–19),"The 39 Steps" directed by S.Spantidas (2017–18),"Oedipus Tree" directed by K.Gakis (2017–18), "Dangerous Liaisons" directed by G.Kimoulis (2016–17),"Wonderful War" by T.Dardaganis (2016–17),"Lahana & Hahana" musical by T.Ioannides (2016–17), "Prometheus Bounded" by J.Falkonis (2016),"Agents" by A.Remoundos (2015), "Trio Reich" by T.Dardaganis (2015), "The Woman In Black" by T.Dardaganis (2014–15),"Freedom in Medea" by K.Filippoglou (2013–14). Assistant Director for C.Theodoridis "Parthenon" (2012), J.Moschou "The Debris" (2013),K.Filippoglou "Tirza" (2014).

She co-hosted the TV show "Εχουμε και λεμε" (Let's talk) for ET1 from 2008 to 2009, along with Rika Vagianni, Renia Louizidou, Manina Zoumpoulaki, and Marion Michelidaki.

Agencies
 IMG, Paris
 The Fashion Model Management, Milan
 Next Model Management, London / N.Y
 Place Model Management, Hamburg
 Wiener Models, Wien
 Time  Models, Zurich
 East West Models
 Chic Management

References

External links

Image Management
Place Model Management
Wiener Models
Vogue - Germany

Living people
Greek female models
1981 births
People from Ptolemaida